Emma Hawia Svensson (born 10 December 1990) is a retired Swedish handball player, who last played for Skuru IK and the Swedish national team.

References

1990 births
Living people
Swedish female handball players
21st-century Swedish women